"Strobelight" is a single from American recording artist Kimberley Locke, her first with Randy Jackson's newly formed dance music label, Dream Merchant 21. The song was written by Rasmus Bille Bähncke, Robbie Nevil, Lauren Evans, Raquelle Garcie, Locke and Cutfather and produced by Bähncke, Cutfather and Jackson. It was released as a single on April 6, 2010. It is also Locke's first release of original material since 2007's Change. 

Following the success Kimberley had on the dance charts with remixes of her prior singles, she was excited to release her first dance song in its original state. "It's exciting for me to come out of the gate with a dance song. '8th World Wonder' 'Band of Gold' were both remixed as dance songs but 'Strobelight' is straight out of the gate as a dance song." Unlike her other singles, this is her first to not be in support of a full album. "I signed a singles only deal with Randy Jackson so there will be no album. We live in a world where people go to itunes and download the songs they want."

Track listings and formats
Digital download
Strobelight - 3:42

The Remixes: US promotional CD
 "Strobelight" (Tony Moran & Warren Rigg Radio Edit)
 "Strobelight" (DJ Renegade Radio Edit)
 "Strobelight" (Donni Hotwheel Radio Edit)
 "Strobelight" (Ray Roc & Gabe Ramos Radio Edit)
 "Strobelight" (Tony Moran & Warren Rigg Remix)
 "Strobelight" (DJ Renegade Club Mix)
 "Strobelight" (Ray Roc & Gabe Ramos Club Mix)
 "Strobelight" (Donni Hotwheel Club Mix)

The Remixes: US digital download
 "Strobelight" (Tony Moran & Warren Rigg Radio Edit)
 "Strobelight" (DJ Renegade Radio Edit)
 "Strobelight" (Donni Hotwheel Radio Edit)
 "Strobelight" (Ray Roc & Gabe Ramos Radio Edit)
 "Strobelight" (Tony Moran & Warren Rigg Club Mix)
 "Strobelight" (DJ Renegade Club Mix)
 "Strobelight" (Donni Hotwheel Club Mix)
 "Strobelight" (Ray Roc & Gabe Ramos Club Mix)
 "Strobelight" (Donni Hotwheel D.H.O.T. Dub)
 "Strobelight" (Donni Hotwheel Vocal Mix)
 "Strobelight" (DJ Renegade Dub)

Charts

References

2010 singles
Kimberley Locke songs
Dance-pop songs
Disco songs
Songs written by Cutfather
Songs written by Robbie Nevil
Songs written by Lauren Evans
2009 songs
2010 songs
Songs written by Rasmus Bille Bahncke
Songs about music
Songs about dancing